The name Ancaeus (Ancient Greek:  Ankaîos) is attributed to two heroes in Greek mythology. Both were among the Argonauts, and each met his death at the tusks of a boar. They are often confused with one another.

Ancaeus, son of Poseidon.
Ancaeus, son of Lycurgus.

Notes

References 

 Apollodorus, The Library with an English Translation by Sir James George Frazer, F.B.A., F.R.S. in 2 Volumes, Cambridge, MA, Harvard University Press; London, William Heinemann Ltd. 1921. ISBN 0-674-99135-4. Online version at the Perseus Digital Library. Greek text available from the same website.
Apollonius Rhodius, Argonautica translated by Robert Cooper Seaton (1853-1915), R. C. Loeb Classical Library Volume 001. London, William Heinemann Ltd, 1912. Online version at the Topos Text Project.
 Apollonius Rhodius, Argonautica. George W. Mooney. London. Longmans, Green. 1912. Greek text available at the Perseus Digital Library.

Characters in Greek mythology